KAMV-LP (101.9 FM) is a defunct, low-power radio station formerly licensed to serve Brighton, Colorado, United States. The station was owned by Alianza Ministerial Vision Milenial.

It formerly broadcast a religious radio format for the Ft. Collins-Greeley area. The station had been silent since November 6, 2007.

History
This station received its original construction permit from the Federal Communications Commission on December 12, 2003. The new station was assigned the call letters KAMV-LP by the FCC on January 7, 2004. KAMV-LP received its license to cover from the FCC on December 8, 2006.

KAMV-LP's license was cancelled by the Federal Communications Commission on April 1, 2013, due to its failure to file a renewal application.

References

External links
 

AMV-LP
AMV-LP
Radio stations established in 2006
Radio stations disestablished in 2013
Defunct radio stations in the United States
Defunct religious radio stations in the United States
2006 establishments in Colorado
2013 disestablishments in Colorado
AMV-LP